Louis Andrew Briscoe (born 2 April 1988) is an English professional footballer who plays for  side Gresley Rovers. His playing position is primarily on the right wing, although he can play as a striker or on the left wing.

He started his career with Football League side Port Vale in 2005, but failed to make an impact and moved on to non-league Leek Town two years later. After brief spells with Hednesford Town, Gresley Rovers, Stafford Rangers, and Ilkeston Town, he won a move to Conference club Mansfield Town in 2009. He helped the club to an FA Trophy final and was named in the Conference Team of the Year in 2010–11. He then won the Conference Premier title with Mansfield in 2012–13. He was loaned out to Nuneaton Town in October 2013, before ending his five-year stay at Mansfield in May 2014. In June 2014 he signed for Torquay United. He joined Wrexham in January 2016, before moving on to Tamworth five months later. He joined Boston United on loan in March 2017, before a permanent move to Stafford Rangers in June 2017. He switched to Sutton Coldfield Town and Mickleover Sports briefly in January 2018, before returning to Stafford Rangers in the summer. He rejoined former club Gresley Rovers in January 2020.

Club career
Born in Burton upon Trent, Staffordshire, Briscoe began his career as a trainee at Port Vale. He made four Football League appearances for Vale, making his debut as a 17-year-old in a 1–0 defeat to Bristol City at Vale Park on 17 December 2005. His three further League One appearances came later on in the 2005–06 season, after which he was voted Youth Player of the Year by the Port Vale management. The following season he made just the one appearance, coming off the bench late into a 4–0 defeat at League Two Hereford United in the FA Cup. Manager Martin Foyle released Briscoe from his contract in January 2007.

Briscoe then joined non-league Leek Town, where he found regular football. He had an unsuccessful trial with Houston Dynamo in March 2008. He bagged a total of 17 goals in 38 Northern Premier League Premier Division games for Leek, before departing in summer 2008 after the club suffered relegation. The next season, he played for a multitude of Northern non-league sides, playing a handful of games for Hednesford Town (in the Premier Division), Gresley Rovers (in Division One South), Stafford Rangers (in the Conference), and Ilkeston Town (in the Premier Division).

Briscoe played under David Holdsworth at Ilkeston, and when Holdsworth was appointed as manager of Mansfield Town in November 2008, he offered the young winger a chance to return to full-time football. Briscoe signed with the "Stags" in January 2009, and made his debut on 17 January against Crawley Town. He scored his first goal for the club against Ebbsfleet United on 7 April. Fitting in well at the Conference Premier club, he made 38 appearances for in the 2009–10 campaign.

In November 2010 he signed a contract to keep him at Mansfield until May 2012. He played 13 goals in 42 league games in 2010–11, though his most telling contribution would be in the FA Trophy, where he booked the club a place in the Wembley final with an extra-time goal against Luton Town in the semi-finals. Despite creating numerous chances for his teammates in the final itself, opponents Darlington triumphed with a 1–0 victory. At the end of the campaign Briscoe was named in the Conference Team of the Year, and was made Mansfield Town's Player of the Season. He scored a hat-trick in a 7–0 demolition of Barrow at Field Mill on 17 March 2012, completing his treble with a 25-yard volley. The "Stags" reached the play-offs in 2011–12, before losing to York City at the semi-final stage. Briscoe scored 11 goals in 40 games.

He scored eight goals in 44 appearances in the 2012–13 campaign, as Mansfield won promotion into the Football League as Conference champions. He was rewarded with a new contract of an undisclosed length. After losing his first team place at Mansfield he joined Conference club Nuneaton Town on a one-month loan in October 2013. Having played only five competitive games in the 2013–14 campaign, Briscoe was released by manager Paul Cox in May 2014.

In June 2014 he signed for newly relegated Conference club Torquay United; "Gulls" manager Chris Hargreaves stated that "Louis has pace, he can beat a man, he has an excellent goal record for a winger, and he can also play up front if needed". He scored eight goals in 45 appearances in the 2014–15 campaign. However, he was released by new manager Kevin Nicholson in January 2016 after failing to score in the 2015–16 season. Pundit Guy Branston supported Nicholson's decision, saying that Briscoe "wasn't pulling up any trees and, if anything, had too many trees on his hips".

Briscoe signed with Wrexham in January 2016, two weeks after leaving divisional rivals Torquay. His move to the Racecourse Ground had been delayed due to a calf injury. However, he made just four appearances before being released by manager Gary Mills at the end of the 2015–16 season. He joined Tamworth in July 2016 after impressing manager Andy Morrell on trial. However, he found game time limited at The Lamb Ground during the 2016–17 season, and so on 17 March he agreed to join National League North rivals Boston United on loan until the end of the season, who were managed by former Mansfield captain Adam Murray. The following day, Briscoe scored on hie "Pilgrims" debut to secure a 2–0 victory away at Worcester City.

Briscoe joined Stafford Rangers for a second time in June 2017. He switched to Northern Premier League Premier Division rivals Sutton Coldfield Town in early January 2018. His stay at Sutton Coldfield lasted a matter of days, as on 19 January 2018 he was announced as a new signing by Mickleover Sports manager John McGrath. Sports finished 13th in the Northern Premier League Premier Division at the end of the 2017–18 campaign and then joined Stafford Rangers for a third time in the summer, helping Rangers to a 14th-place finish in the Northern Premier League Premier Division in 2018–19. On 3 January 2020, he rejoined Gresley, now in the Midland League Premier Division. He scored four goals in twelve games. As a result of the COVID-19 pandemic in England, the 2019–20 season was formally abandoned on 26 March, with all results from the season being expunged. The 2020–21 season was also abandoned due to the ongoing pandemic. He was a player-coach during the 2021–22 season as Gresley won promotion into the Northern Premier League as runners-up of the United Counties League Premier Division North.

International career
While at Mansfield, Briscoe made his debut for England C, the team which represents England at non-league level. He scored in a 1–1 draw with Hungary Under-23's on 15 September 2009.

Career statistics

Honours
Mansfield Town
FA Trophy runner-up: 2011
Conference Premier: 2012–13

Gresley Rovers
United Counties League Premier Division North second-place promotion: 2021–22

Individual
Conference Premier Team of the Year: 2010–11
Mansfield Town F.C. Player of the Season: 2010–11

References

External links

1988 births
Living people
Sportspeople from Burton upon Trent
English footballers
England semi-pro international footballers
Association football forwards
Port Vale F.C. players
Leek Town F.C. players
Hednesford Town F.C. players
Gresley F.C. players
Stafford Rangers F.C. players
Ilkeston Town F.C. (1945) players
Mansfield Town F.C. players
Nuneaton Borough F.C. players
Torquay United F.C. players
Wrexham A.F.C. players
Tamworth F.C. players
Boston United F.C. players
Sutton Coldfield Town F.C. players
Mickleover Sports F.C. players
English Football League players
National League (English football) players
Northern Premier League players
United Counties League players